Brain expressed, X-linked 4 is a protein that in humans is encoded by the BEX4 gene.

This gene is a member of the brain expressed X-linked gene family. Proteins encoded by other members of this family act as transcription elongation factors that allow RNA polymerase II to escape pausing during elongation. Multiple alternatively spliced variants encoding the same protein have been identified.

References

Further reading 

 
 
 
 
 
 
 
 

Genes on human chromosome X